Guarizama is a municipality in the Honduran department of Olancho. 

Its name comes from Quanhilzamatil, tight amate tree, probably in the place had that tree.

Historical data  
In the population census of 1887 listed as Manto Village in 1901 was given municipality status.

Villages 
The municipality has the following five villages:  National Institute of Statistics, Honduras. (Census 2001) 
 Guarizama
 El Zapotal
 La Carta
 El Rodeo
 Trinidad

Demographics
At the time of the 2013 Honduras census, Guarizama municipality had a population of 7,769. Of these, 98.12% were Mestizo, 1.52% White, 0.19% Black or Afro-Honduran and 0.17% Indigenous.

References 

Municipalities of the Olancho Department